Title: Panta Rei (Everything Flows),
Film by Nisvet Hrustic
Production: June, 2005
Duration: 20 minutes
Country of production: Bosnia and Herzegovina
Genre: Documentary/Environmental/Ecology/Nature film
Web site: http://www.nisvethrustic.com
IMDb

Awards 
-Best Documentary film Festival IFCC Jaipur - India 2008.
-SPECIAL MENTION Festival Malescorto - Italy 2005.
-Nominee for Mediterranean Environmental Award 4th edition Almeria - Spain 2008.

Screenings or awards at festivals:
-6th International Short Film Festival Malescorto - Italy 2005. 
-5th KaraFilm Festival Karachi - Pakistan 2005.
-The 14th Tokyo Global Environmental Film Festival Screening of the environmental Film for Children in Tokyo - Japan 2005.
-Rhodes International Films + Visual Arts Festival ECOFILMS - Greece 2006.
-32nd International Film Festival on the Environment and Natural and Cultural Heritage České Budéjovice / Český Krumlov - Czech Republic 2006.
-33rd International Festival of Professional Films Ekotopfilm Bratislava - Slovakia 2006.
-East Silver 2006 Central and Eastern Documentary Film Market Prague - Czech Republic 2006. 
-24e Festival International du Film d’Environnement Paris - France 2006.
-3rd Wildlife Vaasa 2006 International Nature Film Festival Vaasa - Finland 2006.
-B-ucharEST International Film Festival Bucharest - Romania 2007.
-4th Mediterranean Environmental Award Almeria - Spain 2008. 
-2nd International Festival of Short Films on Culture (IFFC) Jaipur - India 2008.
-10th ECO-ETNO-FOLK Film Festival Slatioara - Romania 2008. 
-13th International Environmental Film Festival GREEN VISION St. Petersburg - Russia 2008.
-11th International Panorama of Independent Film-makers of Trade Unions Centre of Thessaloniki - Greece 2009.
-Third World Open Festival of Mass Communications for Children and Youth «The World in the Eyes of Children» Moscow-Russia Traveling Festival will pass on Seagoing Liner of the Pacific ocean 2011.

Reviews / News:
evene.fr
ALLOCINE.COM
Telerama.fr
SENSCRITIQUE.com
CineMagia.ro
cityportal.gr
Village'sNews.gr
DOKweb.net
INFOBIRO Sarajevo
linternauteCinema.com

2005 films